Route 30 is a  east–west arterial route, connecting Grafton with Packard's Corner in Boston.  Route 30 runs roughly parallel to the Massachusetts Turnpike and Route 9, but unlike those two larger highways, takes a more meandering path from town to town. Between Boston and the Charles River it is known as Commonwealth Avenue, along most of this route is part of the course of the Boston Marathon.

Route 30 has two interchanges with the Mass Pike, at Exits 13 in Framingham and 14/15 in Weston; the latter also includes the junction with Interstate 95 (Route 128). It also has two interchanges with Route 9, one in Westborough and one at the Southborough-Framingham border (where the two highways have an interchange without actually crossing), as well as a section further east in Framingham that runs concurrently with Route 9, for a total of four junctions between Routes 9 and 30.

Route description

Route 30 begins in North Grafton at Route 122, where it shares a roadway briefly with Route 140. The route travels northeast, passing the Tufts University Cummings School of Veterinary Medicine. The road continues into Westborough, where it crosses Route 135 at a rotary and interchanges with Route 9 to the northeast. After crossing Route 9, Route 30 turns eastward, crossing underneath Interstate 495 without an interchange. The route continues east into Southborough, where it crosses Route 85. Route 30 interchanges once again with Route 9 (without actually crossing it) and continues to parallel the highway into Framingham. In Framingham, Route 30 joins Route 9 in an approximately one-mile concurrency, and leaves via an interchange with Route 126 (heading eastward, there is a very brief concurrency between routes 30 and 126; heading westward, Route 30 joins Route 9 one block west of the Route 126 interchange). Route 30 continues to the northeast and interchanges with the Massachusetts Turnpike. Route 30 continues northeast, crossing over the Mass. Pike, and very briefly entering Natick before entering Wayland. In Wayland, Route 30 crosses Route 27 and continues northeast, very closely paralleling the Mass Pike. Route 30 continues into Weston, where it enters a large interchange with the Mass. Pike and Interstate 95 (Route 128). Upon crossing over I-95 and the Charles River, there is a drastic change in scenery as one crosses from Boston's suburbs to the metropolitan area. With this, Route 30 enters Newton, crossing over the Mass Pike again and then crossing Route 16. Route 30 winds to the east, passing Boston College in Chestnut Hill and entering the Boston neighborhood of Brighton.

Major intersections

References

030